Emplify, Inc. is a Fishers, Indiana-based privately held Software-as-a-Service (SaaS) company with headquarters in the Nickel Plate District. Its employee engagement software provides employees with a platform to voice feedback to company executives through quarterly, confidential surveys. 

"Emplify" was first introduced as a product line by Bluebridge Digital., Inc. in February 2016. However, upon the sale of Bluebridge's mobile app business in November 2016, the company shifted their focus to employee engagement and adopted the Emplify name as its own.

Corporate history 

Bluebridge Digital., Inc., known as Bluebridge, was founded in 2011 by Santiago Jaramillo out of his college dorm room. The company began as a mobile app platform for churches and tourism organizations built on a proprietary common code base.

In February 2016, Bluebridge acquired Cadence Consulting, which became the initial network of early adopters for the employee engagement sector of the business. As part of the acquisition, Bluebridge also hired Todd Richardson, Cadence Consulting founder and former ExactTarget executive, as their Chief People Officer.

Around this same time, Bluebridge introduced Emplify, which was originally developed for internal company use, as a new product line after employee engagement accounted for more than half of new sales for the company. The launch was boosted with a $3 million round of funding by Midwestern venture capital firms Allos Ventures and Cultivation Capita. “The response was so terrific that we decided to create a new brand focused entirely on employee engagement,” said Jaramillo. Then, in November 2016, Bluebridge hit a pivot point in company direction. It was announced that Bluebridge was selling its church and tourism business units for a combined $8 million to two separate buyers. Bluebridge sold its Bluebridge Churches unit to echurch powered by PushPay, a mobile giving and engagement technology provider for faith-based organizations, and sold its Bluebridge Tourism unit to Simpleview, which provides sales and marketing technology. All proceeds from the sale were turned around and used to invest complete focus and resources into the Emplify product line. This sale marked as the official transition from Bluebridge Digital., Inc. to Emplify, Inc.

 

In September 2018, Emplify announced that it had raised a $7.5 million in a Series A investment round for its employee engagement platform. The round was led by New Jersey based growth equity investment firm Edison Partners, with participation again from Allos Ventures and Cultivation Capita. With this round of funding, Emplify also announced the roll-out of a new Emplify Partner Program with select talent management and consulting firms. 

In October 2019, Edison Partners doubled down on their investment into Emplify when the two announced they had completed a $15 million Series B investment round. The round was again aided by investors Allos Ventures and Cultivation Capita. Emplify announced that this round of funding would allow the company to continue product development and expand its sales and marketing teams. As part of the announcement, Emplify also revealed that it had grown year-over-year revenue by an average of more than 275% since its founding in 2016.

References

Further reading 

 Hunckler, Matt (September 12, 2016). “Emplify Wants to Keep Your Office From Becoming ‘Office Space’.” Forbes
 Briggs, James (July 20, 2016).“Emplify Wants to Replace Office Email With Push Notifications.” MediaPost, Indy Star
 Richardson & Jaramillo (December 2016). “Agile Engagement: How to Drive Lasting Results by Cultivating a Flexible, Responsive, and Collaborative Culture.” Wiley
 Burg, Natalia (December 25, 2015). “How A Mobile App Helped One Organization Boost Employee Engagement”. Forbes
 Schwante, Marcel (April 2, 2020). "3 Great Ways to Motivate Employees in the New 'Stay at Home Economy." Inc.
 Kruse, Kevin (May 13, 2020). "3 Non-Obvious Workplace Changes That Will Occur Because of Covid-19". Forbes
 Jaramillo, Santiago (July 7, 2020). "Three Steps to Chartering The Course For Your Office Reopening". Forbes

Software companies based in Indiana
Defunct software companies of the United States